Garching bei München (Garching near Munich) or Garching is a town in Bavaria, Germany, near Munich. It is the home of several research institutes and university departments on its campus. It became a city on 14 September 1990.

Location

Garching has a number of scientific research institutes and scientific experiment facilities located in the city, including a linear accelerator and a research nuclear reactor. The nuclear research reactor, nicknamed Atomei (atomic egg) appears in the city's coat of arms, and started the process leading to an accumulation of research institutes. A number of roads and places in the city are named after scientists, mathematicians and technical innovators such as Carl von Linde, Rudolf Diesel, Albert Einstein, Leonhard Euler, Werner Heisenberg, Max Planck, Wilhelm Röntgen, and Erwin Schrödinger.

Districts
The town has four districts:
 Garching
 Dirnismaning
 Hochbrück
 Hochschul- und Forschungszentrum (University and Research Centre)

Transport
The Munich U-Bahn line U6 connects the city with the stations Garching-Hochbrück, Garching and Garching-Forschungszentrum.

Educational and research institutes

Several research and scientific educational institutions are based in Garching, including:
 Departments of the Technical University of Munich (TUM)
 Physics
 FRM-II research reactor 
 semiconductor physics and engineering (Walter Schottky Institute)
 Chemistry
 Mechanical Engineering
 Mathematics
 Informatics
 Max Planck Institutes:
 Max Planck Institute for Astrophysics (MPA)
 Max Planck Institute for Extraterrestrial Physics (MPE)
 Max Planck Institute for Plasma Physics (IPP)
 Max Planck Institute for Quantum Optics (MPQ)
 Max Planck Computing and Data Facility (MPCDF)
 Part of the physics department of the Ludwig-Maximilians-Universität
 Headquarters of the European Southern Observatory (ESO)
 ESO Supernova Planetarium & Visitor Centre at ESO Headquarters
 Federal Research Institute for Food Chemistry (Deutsche Forschungsanstalt für Lebensmittelchemie; DFA)
 Walther Meißner Institute (WMI) of the BAdW (low-temperature physics)
 Bavarian Center of Applied Energy Research (ZAE)
 Reactor safety research 
 General Electric Global Research Center
 Leibniz Supercomputing Centre
 BMW M GmbH - high-performance/motorsport vehicle research and development

Relations

Garching is part of the Nordallianz, a group of 8 towns situated between the city of Munich and Munich Airport.

Garching bei München is twinned with:
 Lørenskog (Norway)
 Radeberg (Germany)

Sport
The town's football club VfR Garching, formed in 1921, experienced its greatest success in 2014 when it won promotion to the Regionalliga Bayern for the first time.

References

External links

Official Town Website

 
Munich (district)